

Date
Norway uses three date systems:
 DD.MM.YYYY (e.g., 24.12.2006 for Christmas Eve, or 01.05.2006 for Labour Day) is by far the most common system, and is the one recommended by the Language Council of Norway. The use of strokes and hyphens are also common, especially in handwriting (e.g. 24/12-2005).
 MMMM D. YYYY is used in Lule Sami and Southern Sami languages
 YYYY-MM-DD (the ISO 8601-standard) is used to some extent in official documents and in computer related materials.

Week numbering is also very common both written and orally, albeit less so in private life.

The week always begins on Mondays and ends on Sundays.

Time
Written time is almost always in the 24-hour clock. In spoken language, a mixture of the two systems are used:
 When giving exact times, or when speaking in official settings (radio, TV, etc.), the 24-hour clock is always used. Entertainment shows like  have on the other hand been named after the 12-hour clock.
 When speaking informally, the 12-hour clock is often used. Minutes are usually rounded off to the nearest five minutes, and are given according to the closest half hour period: «» («the clock is ten to half four», i.e., 15:20 or 3:20 p.m.) and «» («the clock is five past half seven», i.e., 18:35 or 6:35 p.m.).

There are two ways of pronouncing numbers:
 The "modern", standard counting: «» («The clock is twentytwo»). The modern variant is used in all official radio programmes and when speaking officially.
 The traditional counting: «» («The clock is twoandtwenty»). The traditional variant is used by some in more informal settings.
Many numbers also have different pronunciations depending on dialect (for instance «» and «» both mean seven, and «» and «» both mean twenty).

References

Time in Norway
Norway